Generally in scattering theory and in particular in quantum mechanics, the Born approximation consists of taking the incident field in place of the total field as the driving field at each point in the scatterer. The Born approximation is named after Max Born who proposed this approximation in early days of quantum theory development.

It is the perturbation method applied to scattering by an extended body.  It is accurate if the scattered field is small compared to the incident field on the scatterer.

For example, the scattering of radio waves by a light styrofoam column can be approximated by assuming that each part of the plastic is polarized by the same electric field that would be present at that point without the column, and then calculating the scattering as a radiation integral over that polarization distribution.

Born approximation to the Lippmann–Schwinger equation

The Lippmann–Schwinger equation for the scattering state  with a momentum p and out-going (+) or in-going (−) boundary conditions is

where  is the free particle Green's function,  is a positive infinitesimal quantity, and  the interaction potential.  is the corresponding free scattering solution sometimes called the incident field.  The factor  on the right hand side is sometimes called the driving field.

Within the Born approximation, the above equation is expressed as 

which is much easier to solve since the right hand side no longer depends on the unknown state .

The obtained solution is the starting point of the Born series.

Born approximation to the scattering amplitude
Using the outgoing free Green's function for a particle with mass  in coordinate space,

one can extract the Born approximation to the scattering amplitude from the Born approximation to the Lippmann–Schwinger equation above,

where  is the transferred momentum.

Applications 

The Born approximation is used in several different physical contexts.

In neutron scattering, the first-order Born approximation is almost always adequate, except for neutron optical phenomena like internal total reflection in a neutron guide, or grazing-incidence small-angle scattering.  The Born approximation has also been used to calculate conductivity in bilayer graphene and to approximate the propagation of long-wavelength waves in elastic media.

The same ideas have also been applied to studying the movements of seismic waves  through the Earth.

Distorted-wave Born approximation 

The Born approximation is simplest when the incident waves  are plane waves. That is, the scatterer is treated as a perturbation to free space or to a homogeneous medium.

In the distorted-wave Born approximation (DWBA), the incident waves are solutions  to a part  of the problem  that is treated by some other method, either analytical or numerical.  The interaction of interest  is treated as a perturbation  to some system  that can be solved by some other method. For nuclear reactions, numerical optical model waves are used. For scattering of charged particles by charged particles, analytic solutions for coulomb scattering are used. This gives the non-Born preliminary equation

and the Born approximation

Other applications include bremsstrahlung and the photoelectric effect. For a charged-particle-induced direct nuclear reaction, the procedure is used twice. There are similar methods that do not use the Born approximations. In condensed-matter research, DWBA is used to analyze grazing-incidence small-angle scattering.

See also 
Born series
Lippmann–Schwinger equation
Dyson series
Electromagnetic modeling
Rayleigh–Gans approximation

References

 
 
 Wu and Ohmura, Quantum Theory of Scattering, Prentice Hall, 1962

Scattering theory
Max Born